Nextlalpan is a municipality in the State of Mexico in Mexico. The municipality covers an area of 42.49 km².  It's municipal seat is the town of Santa Ana Nextlalpan.

As of 2005, the municipality had a total population of 22,507.

Politics

References

See also
San Miguel Jaltocan, a town in the municipality

 
Populated places in the State of Mexico
Nahua settlements